Daşkənd or Dashkend, sometimes also romanized as Tashkend, may refer to:

 Daşkənd, in 1991 Ayrk, Armenia
Daşkənd, Khojali, Azerbaijan
Daşkənd, Yardymli, Azerbaijan
Yeni Daşkənd, Azerbaijan
 Tashkent, a small village in Northern Cyprus

See also
 Tashkent, Uzbekistan, also formerly romanized as Tashkend